Hal Miller (1929–2015) was a British politician

Hal Miller may also refer to 

 Hal Miller (actor) (born 1933), American actor
 Hal Miller (American football) (1930-2011), American sportsman

See also
 Miller (surname)